The Roman Catholic Diocese of Osório is a diocese located in the city of Osório in the Ecclesiastical province of Porto Alegre in Brazil.

History
 10 November 1999: Established as Diocese of Osório from the Diocese of Caxias do Sul and Metropolitan Archdiocese of Porto Alegre

Leadership
 Bishops of Osório (Roman rite)
 Bishop Thadeu Gomes Canellas (1999.11.10 – 2006.11.15)
 Bishop Jaime Pedro Kohl, P.S.D.P. (2006.11.15 – present)

References
 GCatholic.org
 Catholic Hierarchy
 Diocese website (Portuguese)

Roman Catholic dioceses in Brazil
Christian organizations established in 1999
Osorio, Roman Catholic Diocese of
Roman Catholic dioceses and prelatures established in the 20th century
1999 establishments in Brazil